Melanie Bernier may refer to:* Mélanie Bernier (born 1985), French actress
 Melanie Bernier (ski mountaineer) (born 1981), Canadian ski mountaineer